Gilbert Thomas Clancy (May 30, 1922 – March 31, 2011) was a Hall of Fame boxing trainer and one of the most noted boxing commentators of the 1980s and 1990s. 

He worked with such famous boxers as Muhammad Ali, Jerry Quarry, Joe Frazier, and George Foreman, as well as Gerry Cooney in his fight with Foreman. 

In the 1990s, he worked with Oscar De La Hoya, coming out of retirement to do so. Another fighter who Clancy trained was Emile Griffith. Clancy was Griffith's first and only trainer and guided him to world championships in the welterweight and middleweight classes. 

He is a member of the International Boxing Hall of Fame. In 1983, he won the Sam Taub Award for excellence in boxing broadcasting journalism. As a broadcaster, he worked for CBS and HBO and was ringside for the famous "No Mas" fight between Roberto Durán and Sugar Ray Leonard, as well as the "One For The Ages" fight between Michael Moorer and George Foreman. Clancy also hosted and produced Gil Clancy's Boxing Journal on the FNN/Score cable TV network.

Personal life
Clancy and his wife, Nancy, had six children and several grandchildren and great-grandchildren.

References

External links
 Ken Buchanan website

1922 births
2011 deaths
American boxing trainers
Boxing commentators
American male boxers